Nahf (Naḥf or Nahef) is an Arab town in the Northern District of Israel. Archaeologists believe that the area was an important center for viticulture in the Hellenistic period and possibly the Early Bronze Age IB period (ca. 3100 BC).

History
Remains have been found from  Early Bronze IB,  EB II,  Middle Bronze Age II and Iron Age II,  as well as coins from the Ptolemaic dynasty and  Antiochus III. Tombs from the 2nd to the 4th centuries have been found.  Nahf contains  Persian, Hellenistic and Roman  remains.

From archaeological finds, it is assumed that blown glass vessels were produced in the village during the  Byzantine  era. A bath, containing a hypocaust from the same period has also been excavated. Dating from the late Byzantine era, it was in continuous use in the early Umayyad era.

In the  Crusader era it was known as "Nef." In 1249  John Aleman transferred land, including the  casalia of  Beit Jann,  Sajur,  Majd al-Krum and Nahf to the Teutonic Knights.

Remains, including potsherds of bowls,  plates and jars, all from Mamluk era, (fourteenth–fifteenth centuries CE), have been found in archaeological excavations.

Ottoman era
In 1517, the village was incorporated into the Ottoman Empire with the rest of Palestine, and in 1596, Nahaf appeared in Ottoman tax registers as being in  nahiya (subdistrict) of Akka, part of  Sanjak Safad.  It had a population of 108 households and 9 bachelors, all Muslims. The villagers paid a fixed tax rate of 25% on wheat, barley, summer crops, fruit trees, goats and/or beehives, in addition to occasional revenues; a total of 6,629 akçe.

A map from 1799 by Pierre Jacotin  showed the place, named as "Nafeh". When Victor Guérin visited Nahf in 1875, he described the village as containing 400 Muslims and some Greek Orthodox families, while in 1881 Nahf was described as being built of stone, containing 200 Muslims, with olives and arable land.

A population list from about 1887 showed that  Nahf  had about 475 inhabitants;  all  Muslims.

British Mandate era
In the 1922 census of Palestine conducted  by the British Mandate authorities, Nahf  had a population of 818, 2 Jews, 6 Christians and  810  Muslims.  where all the Christians were Orthodox.  At the time of the 1931 census the population had increased to 994, all Muslims, in 194 houses.

In the  1945 statistics  the population of Nahf was 1,320, all Muslims,  who owned 15,745 dunams of land  according to an official land and population survey. 1,088 dunams were plantations and irrigable land, 4,571 used for cereals, while 44 dunams were built-up (urban) land.

State of Israel
Nahf was captured by Israel on 18 July 1948 during Operation Dekel led by the Sheva (Seventh) Brigade. Its defenders included the town's local militia as well as Arab Liberation Army volunteers. The town was left intact and most residents did not flee their homes. There was a massacre carried out by the IDF Moshe Carmel's troops after the fighting was over.  The population remained under Martial Law until 1966.

In and around Nahf, there are a number of archaeological remains dating from the Middle Ages, including mosaics and a cemetery. In a nearby location lies the shrines of Muslim leaders Sheik Muhammad Rabiah and Sheik Mahmud who fought against the Crusaders. The Auba cave, which dates from the time of the Assyrians, is also located here.

Notable structures
The largest medieval structure in the village is a roughly 10 meter long wall, made of large drafted blocks with a rubble core, which may be of Crusader origin.

The Maqam (shrine) of Shaykh Rabi is located on a steep hill above the village, surrounded by a cemetery. It is a domed  rectangular building, with an entrance from the east. A deep mihrab ("Islamic prayer niche") is located inside, in the middle of the south side. By the north wall is the elongated cenotaph of Shaykh Rabi.

See also
 Arab localities in Israel

References

Bibliography

 
   

  
 

  Cited in Petersen, 2001

External links
Official website 
Welcome To Nahf
Survey of Western Palestine, Map 4:   IAA, Wikimedia commons 

Arab localities in Israel
Local councils in Northern District (Israel)